Amnesty (from the Ancient Greek ἀμνηστία, amnestia, "forgetfulness, passing over") is defined as "A pardon extended by the government to a group or class of people, usually for a political offense; the act of a sovereign power officially forgiving certain classes of people who are subject to trial but have not yet been convicted." Though the term general pardon has a similar definition, an amnesty constitutes more than a pardon, in so much as it obliterates all legal remembrance of the offense. Amnesty is increasingly used to express the idea of "freedom" and to refer to when prisoners can go free.

Amnesties, which in the United Kingdom may be granted by the crown or by an act of Parliament, were formerly usual on coronations and similar occasions, but are chiefly exercised towards associations of political criminals, and are sometimes granted absolutely, though more frequently there are certain specified exceptions. Thus, in the case of the earliest recorded amnesty, that of Thrasybulus at Athens, the thirty tyrants and a few others were expressly excluded from its operation; and the amnesty proclaimed on the restoration of Charles II of England did not extend to those who had taken part in the execution of his father. Other famous amnesties include: Napoleon's amnesty of March 13, 1815, from which thirteen eminent persons, including Talleyrand, were exempt; the Prussian amnesty of August 10, 1840; the general amnesty proclaimed by the emperor Franz Josef I of Austria in 1857; the general amnesty granted by President of the United States, Andrew Johnson, after the American Civil War (1861–1865), in 1868, and the French amnesty of 1905. Amnesty in U.S. politics in 1872 meant restoring the right to vote and hold office to ex-Confederates, which was achieved by act of Congress. Those were true amnesties, pardoning past violations without changing the laws violated.

Purposes
An amnesty may be extended when the authority decides that bringing citizens into compliance with a law is more important than punishing them for past offenses. Amnesty after a war helps end a conflict. While laws against treason, sedition, etc. are retained to discourage future traitors during future conflicts, it makes sense to forgive past offenders, after the enemy no longer exists which had attracted their support but a significant number remains in flight from authorities. In 1718, when a general pardon was offered to pirates by the British, its advocates hoped it would dissuade recipients from entering Spanish service while the countries were at war.

Amnesty is often used to encourage people to turn in contraband, as in the case of China's gun restrictions, or the Kansas City ban on pit bulls.
Advantages of using amnesty may include avoiding expensive prosecutions (especially when massive numbers of violators are involved), prompting violators to come forward who might otherwise have eluded authorities, and promoting reconciliation between offenders and society. An example of the latter was the amnesty that was granted to conscientious objectors and draft evaders in the wake of the Vietnam War in the 1970s, in an effort by President Jimmy Carter to heal war wounds, given that both the war and the draft were over.

Controversy
Amnesty can at times raise questions of justice. An example was the Ugandan government's offer not to prosecute alleged war criminal Joseph Kony, in hopes that further bloodshed would be avoided. David Smock noted, "The downside of it is the impunity that it implies; that people can commit atrocities and say that they will only stop if they are given amnesty..."

Controversies also raise towards amnesties given to alleged perpetrators of the most serious crimes of international law (or crimes of the Jus Cogens which include genocide, crimes against humanity, war crimes, and aggression). Courts have rejected amnesties for such crimes, such as the International Criminal Tribunal for the former Yugoslavia and the Special Court for Sierra Leone. But scholars have suggested that there should be room for amnesties which were imperative necessities to achieve peace and accompanied by effective Truth and Reconciliation Commissions. One particular case was in Uruguay: the controversial Law on the Expiration of the Punitive Claims of the State pretended to put an end to unsolved issues deriving from 12 years of civic-military dictatorship; local human rights organizations challenged that law and called a referendum in 1989 which confirmed the law by 56% of the popular vote.

Immigrant amnesty 
The Immigration Reform and Control Act of 1986—signed into law by President Ronald Reagan on November 6, 1986—granted amnesty to about 3 million undocumented immigrants in the United States.

A controversial issue in the United States is whether undocumented immigrants should be granted some form of amnesty. It is proposed that undocumented immigrants be able to come forward and immediately receive probationary status. California Republican Governor Arnold Schwarzenegger said an amnesty program like the one the federal government undertook in 1986 would be ill-advised today. "It backfired big-time. It sent the wrong message: You come here illegally, and then we go and give you amnesty. So then, the next million come and they say, 'Hey, we get amnesty, this is really terrific'."

Related uses of the term 
 The term amnesty is also any initiative where individuals are encouraged to turn over illicit items to the authorities, on the understanding that they will not be prosecuted for having been in possession of those items. A common use of such amnesties is to reduce the number of firearms or other weapons in circulation. Several public schools with a zero-tolerance policy on drugs or weapons have an "amnesty box" in which students may dispose of contraband objects brought to school without consequence.
 Amnesty was used in South Africa, during the 1990s, as part of the TRC (Truth and Reconciliation)
 An amnesty law is any law that retroactively exempts a select group of people, usually military leaders and government leaders,  from criminal liability for crimes committed.
 In the illegal immigration debate, allowing illegal immigrants to legally remain in the United States is often called, usually by its opponents, amnesty. Some observers contend that the word amnesty is improperly applied here. One reason is that the proposals under consideration include financial penalties for illegal immigrants. Another reason is that the government's current practice is generally to deport but not prosecute illegal immigrants and so there is sometimes no legal adjudication of "guilt" to be forgiven.
 Many libraries have an amnesty week where people can return late library books and they will not be charged a fine for having them out.
 At the United States Military Academy, United States Air Force Academy,  and the United States Naval Academy, any head of state visiting the academy may ask the Superintendent to grant amnesty to members of the Corps of Cadets with outstanding punishment tours, freeing the restricted cadets from further punishment tours. In the past this was for all offenses, but in recent times only cadets with minor offenses (company board) are eligible for amnesty, while cadets with major offenses (regimental or higher board) are ineligible.

References

External links
 
 International Center for Transitional Justice, Criminal Justice page

Clemency
Criminal law legal terminology
Peace mechanisms
Impunity